Marungapuri may refer to:
 Marungapuri taluk
 Marungapuri block
 Marungapuri (state assembly constituency)